Parechthistatus is a genus of longhorn beetles of the subfamily Lamiinae, containing the following species:

 Parechthistatus chinensis Breuning, 1942
 Parechthistatus furcifer (Bates, 1884)
 Parechthistatus gibber (Bates, 1873)

References

Phrissomini